Lawn Dogs is a 1997 fantasy-drama film directed by John Duigan and starring Mischa Barton and Sam Rockwell. The film tells the story of a precocious young girl (Barton) from a gated community who befriends a landscape worker (Rockwell), and examines the societal repercussions of their friendship. Written by Naomi Wallace, the film was released by Rank Organisation, and was the company's last production.

The film uses the folktale of Baba Yaga as a prominent plot device. Although filmed in Louisville and Danville, Kentucky in the United States, Lawn Dogs was a British film produced by Duncan Kenworthy. Lawn Dogs won numerous film awards at film festivals in Europe and met with generally positive reviews, with praise for the performances of Barton and Rockwell in particular.

Plot
Ten-year-old Devon Stockard, a precocious and lonely young girl, has recently moved into the gated community Camelot Gardens in the Louisville, Kentucky suburbs with her parents, Morton and Clare. Recently recovered from open heart surgery, Devon is encouraged by her parents to make friends, and is pushed to sell cookies for a charity event for the summer.

While selling the cookies, Devon leaves the gated community against her mother's instructions, and meets Trent Burns, a landscaper living in a trailer in the woods, who works in Camelot Gardens. Imaginative, Devon pretends her life is like the fable of Baba Yaga.

Devon, at first annoying Trent, continues to come to his property and slowly befriends him. Despite the innocence of their friendship, he insists that she keep it a secret because of their age difference. While working in Camelot Gardens, Trent has altercations with two young men who live there; Brett, who is fooling around with Devon's mother; and Sean, a closeted homosexual who flirts with him.

During a family barbecue, exploring her father's car in their garage, Devon finds his handgun in the SUV's glove compartment. Brett discovers her with the it and attempts to molest her, but she escapes. Telling her parents about the incident, they respond by stressing over the social implications and how influential Brett's father is. So, Devon changes the story to that Brett was only trying to tickle her.

Clare begins to notice Devon's friendship with Trent when he comes to do lawn work at their house, and becomes alarmed. Meanwhile, Brett and Sean vandalize Trent's lawnmower, pouring sugar in the fuel tank and start a fight with him after accusing him of stealing CDs from Sean's car.

Devon and Trent's friendship grows, and they visit Trent's mother and his father, a Korean War veteran dying of a lung disease. After leaving their house, Trent and Devon go for a drive in the country. While stopped in a field, she insists that as they are "best friends", she can show him the surgical scar on her chest. Insisting he touch it to his reluctance, she then demands he show her the abdominal scar he sustained in a shooting. After this, they see Sean's escaped dog, running through the field. While trying to chase it down in the truck, they accidentally run him over. Trent kills the badly injured dog although Devon pleas for him not to, and she runs home in a panic.

Clare and Morton, concerned over Devon's frantic behavior, ask her what happened. She won't provide details, only saying that Trent killed Sean's dog and mentions she and Trent took turns showing each other their scars. Assuming that Trent molested her, Morton drives out to Trent's property with Devon, assisted by Sean and the ex-cop security guard of Camelot Gardens. The three confront Trent while Devon sits in the car.

Morton and Sean take turns beating Trent, and Morton accuses him of sexually abusing Devon. He attacks Trent with a piece of wood, beating him to the ground, handing it to Sean; but before he can hit him, Devon exits her father's car with his gun, shooting him in the abdomen. As Sean bleeds on the ground, Devon urges Trent to leave, and they say their goodbyes.

Armed with her father's gun, Devon orders her dad to lift her up into the tree she and Trent had decorated with ribbons, and she imagines a river and a forest rising up behind Trent as he drives away, protecting him as he escapes.

Cast
 Mischa Barton as Devon Stockard
 Sam Rockwell as Trent Burns
 Christopher McDonald as Morton Stockard
 Kathleen Quinlan as Clare Stockard
 Miles Meehan as Billy
 Bruce McGill as Nash
 David Barry Gray as Brett
 Eric Mabius as Sean
 Angie Harmon as Pam
 José Orlando Araque as Mailman
 Beth Grant as Mrs. Burns
 Tom Aldredge as Mr. Burns
 Odin the Dog and Tafeki the Dog as Tracker

Production
The film was based on an original screenplay by Naomi Wallace, a playwright and poet from Kentucky.
It was financed by Rank Organisation, the first film the British company had fully financed in sixteen years.

Reception
The film was well received by critics, based on 18 reviews collected by Rotten Tomatoes it holds a 72% "Certified Fresh" overall approval rating.
Time Out praised Duigan in that he "maintains an atmosphere where dream is a short step from nightmare. Quirkily haunting." Janet Maslin of The New York Times praised the casting of Barton and Rockwell "it also shows off a poised young actress and a leading man with charisma to burn." Maslin felt that the "pointedly whimsical film overworks the fairy-tale aspect of this friendship (between Devon and Trent)", she concluded that Duigan "does breathe life into a story that rails against conventional wisdom." Empire praised Barton's "hypnotic central performance" and Wallace's "intelligent first screenplay". The review continued to note that "Duigan makes imaginative use of his material, heightening Devon's home-life horrors to semi-cartoonishness without stretching credibility, and the fantasy finale is a winner."

A dissenting review came from Roger Ebert, who wrote in the Chicago Sun-Times that Lawn Dogs is well-made but ultimately directionless and without meaning: "All of [the film's] events happen with the precision and vivid detail of a David Lynch movie, but I do not know why. It is easy to make a film about people who are pigs and people who are free spirits, but unless you show how or why they got that way, they're simply characters you've created."

Accolades

References

External links
 
 
 

1997 films
1997 independent films
British drama films
1997 drama films
1990s English-language films
British independent films
Films directed by John Duigan
Films shot in Kentucky
Danville, Kentucky
Films scored by Trevor Jones
1990s British films